Archer is an unincorporated community in Curran Township, Sangamon County, Illinois, United States. Archer is located on the Sangamon Valley Trail on the western border of Springfield.

References

Unincorporated communities in Sangamon County, Illinois
Unincorporated communities in Illinois